"Another Place to Fall" is a song by Scottish singer KT Tunstall. The song was written by Tunstall and produced by Steve Osborne for Tunstall's 2004 debut album, Eye to the Telescope. It was released as the album's fifth and final single on 13 March 2006. The song reached number 52 on the UK Singles Chart, remaining on the chart for two weeks.

Formats and track listings
CD single
 "Another Place to Fall" (Radio Version) – 3:45
 "Fake Plastic Trees" (BBC Radio 1 Live Version) – 3:28

Vinyl single
 "Another Place to Fall" (Radio Version) – 3:45
 "Universe & U" (KT Tunstall's Acoustic Extravaganza Version) – 4:34

Release history

Notes

2004 songs
2006 singles
KT Tunstall songs
Music videos directed by Tim Pope
Songs written by KT Tunstall